The 1912 Pittsburgh Pirates season was a season in American baseball, the 31st in franchise history. The team finished second in the National League with a record of 93–58, 10 games behind the New York Giants.

During the season, Chief Wilson set a major league record by hitting 36 triples in a single season. After 118 games, Chief Wilson already had 33 triples and was on pace to get 43 triples.

In their 23–4 win against the Cincinnati Reds on April 27, the Pirates recorded a .628 batting average, the highest by any team in a single game from 1901 onwards.

Regular season

Season standings

Record vs. opponents

Opening Day lineup

Notable transactions 
 September 16, 1912: Everitt Booe was drafted by the Pirates from the Fort Wayne Railroaders in the 1912 rule 5 draft.

Roster

Player stats

Batting

Starters by position 
Note: Pos = Position; G = Games played; AB = At bats; H = Hits; Avg. = Batting average; HR = Home runs; RBI = Runs batted in

Other batters 
Note: G = Games played; AB = At bats; H = Hits; Avg. = Batting average; HR = Home runs; RBI = Runs batted in

Pitching

Starting pitchers 
Note: G = Games pitched; IP = Innings pitched; W = Wins; L = Losses; ERA = Earned run average; SO = Strikeouts

Other pitchers 
Note: G = Games pitched; IP = Innings pitched; W = Wins; L = Losses; ERA = Earned run average; SO = Strikeouts

Relief pitchers 
Note: G = Games pitched; IP = Innings pitched; W = Wins; L = Losses; ERA = Earned run average; SO = Strikeouts

Chief Wilson's 36 triples

References

External links
 1912 Pittsburgh Pirates at Baseball Reference
 1912 Pittsburgh Pirates at Baseball Almanac

Pittsburgh Pirates seasons
Pittsburgh Pirates season
Pittsburgh Pirates